The Taexali (or Taezali) were a people of ancient Scotland, known only from a single mention of them by the geographer Ptolemy c. 150. From his general description and the approximate location of their town or principal place that he called 'Devana', their territory was along the northeastern coast of Scotland and is known to have included Buchan Ness, as Ptolemy refers to the promontory as 'Taexalon Promontory'.

See also
List of Celtic tribes

References

 

Historical Celtic peoples
Picts
Tribes mentioned by Ptolemy